Truax or Truaxe is a surname. Notable people with the surname include:

Barry Truax (born 1947), Canadian composer
Billy Truax (born 1947), American professional football player
Carol Truax (1899–1986), American music administrator and cookbook author
C. B. Truax, author of "Rating of Accurate Empathy", U. of Wisconsin Press, 1967
Charles V. Truax (1887–1935), U.S. Representative from Ohio
Jay Truax, American bass player and singer with the band Love Song
Reuben Eldridge Truax (1847–1935), Canadian businessman and politician
Rhoda Truax (1901–2000), American author
Robert Truax (1918–2010), American rocket engineer
Sarah Truax (1872–1958), American stage actor
Thomas Truax, American composer, performer and inventor
Dennis D. Truax, American Civil Engineer, ASCE President 2022